Łopiennik Nadrzeczny  is a village in the administrative district of Gmina Łopiennik Górny, within Krasnystaw County, Lublin Voivodeship, in eastern Poland.

References

Villages in Krasnystaw County